Orapin Waenngoen (born 7 October 1995) is a Thai international footballer who plays as a midfielder.

She participated at the 2018 AFC Women's Futsal Championship. She was selected for the 2019 FIFA Women's World Cup. On the club level, she plays for BG Bundit Asia.

International goals
Scores and results list Thailand's goal tally first.

References

External links

1995 births
Living people
Women's association football midfielders
Orapin Waenngoen
Orapin Waenngoen
2019 FIFA Women's World Cup players
Orapin Waenngoen
Orapin Waenngoen